The United Left ( Enomeni Aristera, EA) was an electoral union formed between the Communist Party of Greece, Communist Party of Greece (Interior) and the United Democratic Left (EDA) to contest the 1974 Greek legislative election. The UL took 9.47% of the vote and won eight seats.

Election results

Hellenic Parliament

Political parties established in 1974
Communist Party of Greece
Defunct communist parties in Greece
Defunct political party alliances in Greece
1974 establishments in Greece
United fronts
United Democratic Left